Tom Bianchi (born 1945) is an American writer and photographer who specializes in male nude photography.

Career
His 21 books of photographs, poems, and essays primarily cover the gay male experience.
 
In 1990, St. Martin's Press published Out of the Studio, Bianchi's book of male nudes, frankly gay and affectionally connected.  Thereafter, 20 of Bianchi's books have been published, three documentary films about Bianchi's work have been distributed, and Bianchi's work has been published in more than thirty anthologies on the male nude.  His On the Couch series, Deep Sex, Erotic Triggers and Fine Art Sex deal with the expression of conscious sexual energy.  His book Fire Island Pines Polaroids 1975–1983, made with his partner, Ben Smales, was honored by Time magazine's list of the Best Photo Books of 2013.

Personal life and AIDS activism
Bianchi was born and raised in the suburbs of Chicago. Bianchi studied political science at the University of New Mexico, and subsequently earned a J.D. degree at Northwestern University School of Law. He practiced corporate law for ten years in Chicago and Washington, D.C. At thirty-four, he left his position as senior counsel at Columbia Pictures, tore up his J.D. degree, pasted it into a painting and had his first one-man show with Betty Parsons and Carol Dreyfuss in New York.  Shortly thereafter, he had his first major museum retrospective at the Spoleto Festival in 1984. Bianchi currently resides in Palm Springs, California.

Exhibitions

 2013 – Tom Bianchi Gallery – 'Fire Island Polaroids | Men in Blue Water | Classic Black and Whites – solo show
 2009 – Exposure Gallery, Palm Springs – Men in Blue Water – solo show – photographs
 2008 – Philip Hitchcock Gallery, St. Louis – Fire Island Pines – solo show – Polaroid SX-70s Fire Island Pines in the 1970s
 2008 – Exposure Gallery, Palm Springs – Fire Island Pines – solo show – Polaroid SX-70s taken in the Pines in the 1970s
 2007 – Jean Albano Gallery, Chicago – Relationships – group show – photographs
 2006 – Jean Albano Gallery, Chicago – solo show – photographs
 2006 – Exposure Gallery, Palm Springs – Tom Bianchi, Men in Blue Water – solo show – photographs
 2006 – Exposure Gallery, Palm Springs – Architecture – group show – photographs
 2006 – Exposure Gallery, Palm Springs – Classic Nudes – group show – photographs
 2005 – Jerry Miller Gallery, Palm Springs – solo show – drawings
 2005 – Jerry Miller Gallery, Palm Springs – On the Couch – solo show – photographs
 2005 – Dennis O'Connor Gallery, Toronto – On the Couch – solo show – photographs
 2003 – Photography Institute, Tokyo – Living with Dickens – solo show
 2002 – Milwaukee Art Institute, Milwaukee – The Male Figure – group show – photographs – curated by William Doan

Bibliography

 Out of the Studio (1991)
 Living with Dickens (1993)
 Bob and Rod (1994)
 Extraordinary Friends (1995)
 In Defense of Beauty (1995)
 Bianchi: Outpost (1996)
 Among Women (1996)
 In the Studio (1998)
 Men I've Loved: Prose, Poems and Pictures (2001)
 On the Couch Vol. 1 (2002)
 On the Couch Vol. 2 (2004)
 Deep Sex (2006)
 Fire Island Pines (2013)
 63 E 9th Street (2019)

References

External links
 , his official website
 
 

1945 births
Living people
American gay artists
American gay writers
LGBT people from California
LGBT people from Illinois
Artists from California
Artists from Oak Park, Illinois
Northwestern University alumni
Nude photography
People with HIV/AIDS
Photographers from California
Photographers from Illinois
University of New Mexico alumni
Writers from Oak Park, Illinois
Writers from Palm Springs, California
20th-century American photographers
21st-century American photographers
20th-century American male writers
21st-century American male writers
20th-century American male artists
21st-century American male artists